The 1988 Cupa României Final was the 50th final of Romania's most prestigious football cup competition. The match was between Steaua București and Dinamo București, and was won by Steaua București. It was the club's 16th cup, but later in 1990 Steaua gave back the trophy because it was won unfairly.

Route to the final

Background
The goal scored by Balint was annulled because of offside, at the signaling of assistant referee George Ionescu. Steaua retired from the field after the command of Valentin Ceaușescu, the son of president Nicolae Ceaușescu, but the Romanian Football Federation offered the Cup to Steaua București. In 1990, Steaua renounced the trophy because it was won unjustly.

The match was interrupted in 90th minute at the score 1–1, because the goal scored by Steaua was cancelled for the offside. In the end, the final was 2–1 for Steaua, but the team renounced the trophy.

Match details

See also
List of Cupa României finals

References

External links
Romaniansoccer.ro

1988
Cupa
Romania
FC Steaua București matches